Biron Dewal is a village in the Rudraprayag district of Uttarakhand state in northern India. It is about 3 km from Chandrapuri.

Villages in Rudraprayag district